John B. Williams is a United States Air Force major general who most recently served as the Mobilization Assistant to the Commander of the Air Mobility Command from July 2020 to July 2021. Previously, he was the Mobilization Assistant to the Commander of the Pacific Air Forces.

References

External links
 

Year of birth missing (living people)
Living people
Place of birth missing (living people)
United States Air Force generals